The Big Creek Greenway is a multi-use trail with two completed sections along Big Creek (formerly known as Vickery Creek) in the state of Georgia, United States. The first section begins at Big Creek Park in Roswell, GA and currently runs  to Marconi Drive in Alpharetta. A second completed section of the trail begins in Forsyth County at McFarland Parkway and runs 11 miles (15.4 km).  Once complete, the trail will be 12 feet (3.7 m) wide and traverse the cities of Roswell, Alpharetta and Cumming.

Access points

Big Creek Park (Old Alabama Road, Roswell, GA)
Barrington Farms Neighborhood (No Public Greenway Parking)
Mansell Crossing (No Public Greenway Parking)
North Point Parkway
Rock Mill Park (Kimball Bridge Road, Alpharetta, GA)
Haynes Bridge Road
Old Milton Parkway (No Public Greenway Parking)
Preston Ridge (Ed Isakson/Alpharetta YMCA)
Marconi Drive
6265 Cortland Walk (Halcyon, Forsyth County)
5259 Union Hill Road (Forsyth County)
4110 Carolene Way (Fowler Park, Forsyth County)
5120 Bethelview Road (Forsyth County)

Bike Share 
In 2016 the City of Alpharetta partnered with Zagster, Inc to provide free bike share for Big Creek Greenway users.  Bikes can be rented for up to 3 hrs free of charge.  Stations are now located at 4 stops along the Big Creek Greenway Bike program was discontinued in May 2020.

Locations:

 Big Creek Park (Roswell, GA)
 North Point Parkway - Greenway Parking Lot
 Rock Mill Park
 Ed Isakson YMCA

Future expansion

Forsyth County
In December 2017, the Alpharetta City Council approved spending $407,425 to have its on-call engineering consultant design the Big Creek Greenway extension from the trail's current terminus at Marconi Drive north to Union Hill Park on the Fulton-Forsyth county line.

The trail design is expected to be completed 9 to 12 months after the notice to proceed.

Milton
The city of Milton is currently in the concept study phase of establishing a connection to the greenway.

See also
Cycling infrastructure
10-Minute Walk
Smart growth
Walkability

References

External links
Big Creek Greenway website
Bike Roswell! Big Creek Greenway info page

Bike paths in Georgia (U.S. state)
Roswell, Georgia
Transportation in Fulton County, Georgia
Transportation in Forsyth County, Georgia